Savas Mihail Matsas (or Savas Michael Matsas or Savas Michael-Matsas; ; born as Sabetai Benaki Matsas (Σαμπετάι Μπενάκη Μάτσας) 1947, Athens) is a Greek Jewish intellectual, leader of the Workers Revolutionary Party (Greece). He is an antizionist and internationalist author of a considerable work of culture about literature, philosophy, religion and class struggle.

Political prosecution
In 2009, the far-right Golden Dawn party filed, before the Greek justice, many documents against several left-wing Greek authors. The police wanted to interrogate all of them, but they jointly agreed not to appear in court and jointly signed a document stating they legally rejected the accusations. After reviewing the documentation, two of them were brought to justice by the Attorney General: Savas Matsas and Constantin Motzouri, the former rector of the National Technical University of Athens. There was an international petition in his defence.

On 4 September 2013, an Athens court acquitted Matsas and Moutzouris of all charges.

Works
Figures du Messianique (1999) (A compilation of essays published in that year; in French)
Golem. A propos du sujet et d’autres fantômes (2010) (About Golem, Kafka, Hölderlin, Lacan, Philippe Lacoue-Labarthe, Hegel, Marx and modern Greek poets such as Andreas Embirikos, universal literature and revolutionary marxism.

References

Links
Fascism in Europe. Lecture of Savas Matsas (Greece) 

1947 births
Anti-Zionist Jews
Living people
Writers from Athens
Romaniote Jews
Greek communists
Greek Trotskyists
Jewish philosophers
Jewish Greek politicians
Jewish socialists
Jewish writers
Trials of political people